Gomophia is a genus of sea stars.

List of species 
These species are accepted in the World Register of Marine Species:
 Gomophia egeriae A. M. Clark, 1967
 Gomophia egyptiaca Gray, 1840
 Gomophia sphenisci (A.M. Clark, 1967)
 Gomophia watsoni (Livingstone, 1936)

SeaLife Base has a different taxonomy : 
 Gomophia egyptiaca Gray, 1840
 Gomophia gomophia (Perrier, 1875) 
 Gomophia mamillifera (Livingstone, 1930)

References

Ophidiasteridae
Asteroidea genera